Phillip Harboe (born 20 July 1982) is a Chilean former professional tennis player.

Harboe had a career high singles ranking of 312, with his only ATP Tour main draw appearance coming at the 2005 Chile Open. Following qualifying wins over Iván Navarro, Juan Pablo Brzezicki and Jan Frode Andersen, Harboe lost his first round match in three sets to Santiago Ventura. He featured in three further Chile Open main draws in doubles.

ITF Futures titles

Singles: (1)

Doubles: (3)

References

External links
 
 

1982 births
Living people
Chilean male tennis players
20th-century Chilean people
21st-century Chilean people